The 2021 Southland Conference women's basketball tournament, a part of the 2020–21 NCAA Division I women's basketball season, took place March 9–14, 2021, at the Merrell Center in Katy, Texas. Stephen F. Austin won the tournament, claiming its 16th and final Southland Conference title, and received the Southland's automatic bid to the 2021 NCAA tournament. SFA is one of five schools that will leave the Southland on July 1, 2021, with SFA being one of four joining the Western Athletic Conference.

Seeds
Only the top ten teams advanced to the Southland Conference tournament.

Schedule

Bracket

See also
2021 Southland Conference men's basketball tournament

References

External links
 2021 Southland Conference Basketball Tournament

2020–21 Southland Conference women's basketball season
Southland Conference women's basketball tournament
Southland Conference Women's basketball